Juan Jesús Gutiérrez (born 7 September 1969) is a Mexican sprinter. He competed in the men's 4 × 400 metres relay at the 1992 Summer Olympics.

References

1969 births
Living people
Athletes (track and field) at the 1992 Summer Olympics
Mexican male sprinters
Olympic athletes of Mexico
Place of birth missing (living people)
20th-century Mexican people